Robert Milo Leicester Devereux, 18th Viscount Hereford (4 November 1932 – 25 February 2004) was a member of the House of Lords and Premier Viscount of England.

Life
Only son of The Hon. Godfrey Devereux JP (1894 † 1934), he succeeded his grandfather, the 17th Viscount Hereford, in the family titles on 16 April 1952.

Lord Hereford was educated at Eton before being commissioned in the Royal Horse Guards (1960–63). Lieut. The Viscount Hereford was appointed an Officer of the Order of St John, and later he was elected a Fellow of the Royal Philharmonic Society.

Lord Hereford lived at Hampton Court, Herefordshire with his wife Susan Mary, only child of Major Maurice Godley, ADC to the Governor of Fiji. They had two sons, the 19th Viscount Hereford and Hon. Edward Devereux, QC.

Arms

See also 
 Devereux baronets

References

External links
Devereux family genealogy
Hereford, Viscount (E, 1550)

1932 births
2004 deaths
People from Herefordshire
People educated at Eton College
Robert 18
Officers of the Order of St John
Royal Horse Guards officers
Robert
20th-century English nobility
Hereford